Faujasiopsis reticulata, the oreille de souris, is a species of flowering plant in the family Asteraceae. It is found only in Mauritius. Its natural habitat is subtropical or tropical dry forests.

References

reticulata
Endemic flora of Mauritius
Critically endangered plants
Taxonomy articles created by Polbot